Thomaz Coelho Station is a subway station on the Rio de Janeiro Metro that services the Rio de Janeiro neighbourhood of Tomás Coelho.

References

Metrô Rio stations
Railway stations opened in 1996
1996 establishments in Brazil